Ivanili is a village in Gabrovo Municipality, in Gabrovo Province, in northern central Bulgaria. It is located north of Gabrovo on the Strazhata plateau. It is built on the northern valley slope of a small tributary of Yantra, where it forms the 7 meters tall Ivanili waterfall.

Honours

Ivanili Heights on Oscar II Coast in Graham Land, Antarctica is named after the village.

References

Villages in Gabrovo Province